Sebastián Umegido Durán (born 14 April 1993 in Cuernavaca, Morelos) is a Mexican professional footballer who last played for Athletic Morelos.

External links
 
 

Living people
1993 births
Association football forwards
Ballenas Galeana Morelos footballers
Selva Cañera footballers
Ascenso MX players
Liga Premier de México players
Tercera División de México players
Sportspeople from Cuernavaca
Footballers from Morelos
Mexican footballers